The following article presents a summary of the 2006-07 football season in Venezuela.

Torneo Apertura ("Opening" Tournament)

Top scorers

Torneo Clausura ("Closing" Tournament)

Top scorers

"Championship" playoff 
Caracas F.C. and U.A. Maracaibo ended with one championship each at the end of the Apertura and Clausura. Tournament rules establish that a playoff game is required.

Aggregate Table

Venezuela national team 
This section will cover Venezuela's games from August 16, 2006 until the end of the Copa América 2007.

KEY:
 F = Friendly match
 CA07 = Copa América 2007 match

External links 
 Venezuelan Football Federation 
 RSSSF

 
Seasons in Venezuelan football